Ottowia is a genus of bacteria from the family of Comamonadaceae.

References

Further reading 
 
 

Comamonadaceae
Bacteria genera